Scirpophaga virginia is a moth in the family Crambidae. It was described by Schultze in 1908. It is found in China (Heilongjiang, Beijing, Shandong, Henan, Shaanxi, Shanghai, Jiangsu, Anhui, Hubei, Jiangxi, Hunan, Fujian, Guangxi, Yunnan), Taiwan, Japan, Bangladesh, Vietnam, Thailand, Sri Lanka, western Malaysia, Singapore, Borneo, Sumatra and the Philippines.

The wingspan is 13–17 mm for males and 16–22 mm for females. The forewings of the males are white to pale ochreous white and the hindwings are white. Females have white forewings and hindwings.

The larvae feed on Oryza sativa.

References

Moths described in 1908
Schoenobiinae
Moths of Asia